These are the results of the men's team all-around competition, one of eight events for male competitors in artistic gymnastics at the 1972 Summer Olympics in Munich.  The compulsory and optional rounds took place on August 27 and 29 at the Sports Hall.

Medalists

Results
The final score for each team was determined by combining all of the scores earned by the team on each apparatus during the compulsory and optional rounds.  If all six gymnasts on a team performed a routine on a single apparatus during compulsories or optionals, only the five highest scores on that apparatus counted toward the team total.

References
Official Olympic Report
www.gymnasticsresults.com
www.gymn-forum.net

Men's team all-around
Men's events at the 1972 Summer Olympics